The 2007 European Individual Speedway Junior Championship was the 10th UEM Individual Speedway Junior European Championship season. The Final took place on August 19, 2007 in Częstochowa, Poland. European Championship was won by Nicolai Klindt from Denmark.

Calendar

Domestic Qualifications

Poland 

Final of Domestic Qualification to Individual Junior European Championship
April 13, 2007
 Opole
Referee: Wojciech Grodzki
Attendance: 400
Best Time: 62.3 - Grzegorz Zengota in 1st heat
Riders placed 1st to 4th in Domestic Final was qualify to the European Semi-Finals. Fifth Polish rider (Łopaczewski) was nominated (as wild card) by Main Commission of Speedway Sport (GKSŻ). Next 3 riders (Miturski, Szewczykowski and Kajoch) was started in Championships also, because they replaced riders from another country.

Qualification
Semi-Final A:
May 28, 2007
 Miskolc
Semi-Final B:
June 9, 2007
 Seinäjoki
Semi-Final C:
July 14, 2007
 Daugavpils

Final 
August 19, 2007
 Częstochowa

References

 Świat Żużla, No 4 (42) /2007, pages 45, 61,

See also 

2007
European Individual Junior